Sarapiquí may refer to:

 Sarapiquí (canton), in the province of Heredia, Costa Rica
 Sarapiquí, Alajuela, a district in the canton of Alajuela, Costa Rica
 Sarapiquí River in the province of Heredia, Costa Rica